The Office of Drug Abuse Law Enforcement (ODALE) was a Justice Department agency that Richard Nixon established in January 1972, headed by Myles Ambrose. The office was chiefly a tool for the federal government to assist local government in enforcing drug laws and oblige drug addicts to undergo rehabilitation. In July 1973, ODALE was consolidated, along with several other agencies, into the newly established Drug Enforcement Administration.

Sources
The Quest for Drug Control by David F. Musto, Pamela Korsmeyer
PBS Frontline:Thirty Years of America's Drug War

Defunct federal law enforcement agencies of the United States
History of drug control
Government agencies established in 1972
Drugs in the United States
Drug Enforcement Administration
History of drug control in the United States
1972 establishments in the United States
Government agencies disestablished in 1973
1973 disestablishments in the United States